PPB can stand for:

 Production possibility boundary , a concept in economics
 Parts per billion, describing small values of miscellaneous dimensionless quantities
 Portland Police Bureau, in Portland, Oregon, U.S.
 Partido Progressista Brasileiro, former name of Progressive Party of Brazil
 Pleuropulmonary blastoma, a type of lung cancer
 PPB Group, a Malaysian company

See also
 Point Pleasant Beach, New Jersey
 List of Pirate Parties